Tororo Girls Secondary School, commonly known as Tororo Girls School (TGS), is an all-girls boarding school covering grades 8 -13 in the Eastern Region of Uganda.

Location
This is appro , by road, east of Kampala, the capital and largest city of Uganda. The coordinates of the school campus are 0°39'57.0"N, 34°11'21.0"E (Latitude:0.665833; Longitude:34.189167).

Notable alumni
Some of the notable women who  have attended TGS include the following:
 Jennifer Musisi: Lawyer and administrator. First executive director of the Kampala Capital City Authority, from 2011 until 15 December 2018.
 Beatrice Wabudeya: Veterinary doctor, politician.
 Grace Freedom Kwiyucwiny: Politician. She is the State Minister for Northern Uganda in the Ugandan Cabinet.
 Ruth Doreen Mutebe: Accountant/Auditor. Head of Audit at Umeme Limited (2018 - present).
 Esta Nambayo: Lawyer and judge.
 Christine Alalo: Peacekeeper.
 Rachael Magoola: Singer, songwriter and dancer.
 Agnes Ameede: Politician

Notable faculty
 Namirembe Bitamazire: Former Minister of Education in the Cabinet of Uganda. She served as the principal of TGS from 1971 until 1974.

See also
Education in Uganda
List of schools in Uganda

References

External links
Official Website of Tororo Girls School

Educational institutions established in 1960
Schools in Uganda
Girls' schools in Uganda
Tororo District
1960 establishments in Uganda
Boarding schools in Uganda